"Down and Out in New York City" is a song written by Bodie Chandler and Barry De Vorzon and recorded by James Brown. It appears in the film Black Caesar and is included on the film's soundtrack album. The song was co-arranged by Fred Wesley. It was released as a single in 1973 and charted #13 R&B and #50 Pop.

Chart performance

Samples
The song was sampled by the rapper Prodigy on the album Return of the Mac.

References

James Brown songs
Songs written by Barry De Vorzon
1973 singles
Songs about New York City
1973 songs
King Records (United States) singles